Gonocephalus pyrius, the angle-headed dragon,  is a species of agamid lizard. It is found in Sumatra.

References

Gonocephalus
Reptiles of Indonesia
Reptiles described in 2021
Fauna of Sumatra